Jennifer Walcott (born May 8, 1977) is an American glamour model and actress best known as Playboy magazine's Playmate of the Month for August 2001.

Early life 
Walcott was born to a family of four children. Her childhood was spent in Youngstown, Ohio. She was a cheerleader and a dancer growing up. In 1995, she graduated from Lowellville High School. Walcott wanted to be a veterinarian, mostly because she had many pets at her house.

In October 1996, at the age of nineteen, Walcott visited Los Angeles and decided to move there. The first few years in L.A. were rough, as she worked two jobs while taking business classes at Santa Monica College. In 2000, Walcott temporarily moved to Chicago to be close to her grandmother, who was very ill. When her grandmother died, Walcott decided to move back to Los Angeles.

Career
After her move back to Los Angeles, Walcott decided to become a model. In late 2000 and early 2001, she attended a Playboy party as a makeup artist working an event, and was taken notice of by accident; she was scheduled to shoot in mid-2001. She was chosen as the Playmate of the Month for August 2001. She subsequently launched her own website, and appeared in many Playboy magazines. She was chosen by Carmen Electra to model for her celebrity guest photographer photo shoot on playboy.com.

She has appeared in several music videos, including videos for Justin Timberlake, Sterophonics, and Marc Anthony.

Walcott was on the Playboy Xtreme team.

During her first pregnancy, she appeared on the cover of Holistic Health Magazine, explaining to the magazine that she chose to maintain her pregnancy and birth organically, without the use of drugs.

Walcott has posed in and for the covers of Moves,  American Curves, Muscle & Fitness, Hers, Physical, Iron Man, VP Racing Fuel, Playboys swimsuit calendar, Performance Audio and Sound, AtoZ, Playboy Catalog, Planet Muscle, 944, Stun, Matco calendar, Flirt catalog,  People (Australian magazine) and many Playboy Special Editions.

In 2005, Walcott, Scarlett Keegan and Destiny Davis were given keys to Las Vegas by the mayor in appreciation for posing for a calendar promoting the city.

In 2005, Walcott appeared in American Pie: Band Camp. In 2008, she was in the movie The Pool Boys. She is now the spokesperson for Ciclon rum and Bally's slot machine.  She is also the new Mickey's girl.

She has been featured on many television shows such as Weakest Link, Street Smarts, Dog Eat Dog, Wild On!, Russian roulette, Howard Stern, MTV Cribs, Entertainment Tonight, Best Damn Sports Show Period, Ripley's Believe It or Not, The Other Half, and has been featured on E! True Hollywood Story (football wives) and  Mom Time.

Walcott was chosen as a finalist to compete in the 2006 WWE Diva Search, but dropped out due to conflicts with other projects.  She also won SPiN's Hottest Significant other.

As of late 2009, Walcott co-hosted a local advice show in Arizona called Mom Time TV.

Walcott has appeared several times as a "Postal Babe" on Running with Scissors' official website. She appeared as herself in the Postal III video game.

Personal life
Walcott is married to former NFL safety Adam Archuleta. They live in L.A and had their first child on April 10, 2008.

Walcott volunteers at the Ronald McDonald House in Washington, DC.

Walcott is also a poet. One of her poems won a statewide Reader's Digest contest.

Filmography
 American Pie Presents: Band Camp (2005)
 The Pool Boys (2008)

References

External links

 
 Jennifer Walcott at Facebook
 

Actresses from Youngstown, Ohio
2000s Playboy Playmates
WWE Diva Search contestants
1977 births
Living people
21st-century American women